The southwestern tablelands comprise an ecoregion running from east-central to south-east Colorado, east-central and a small portion of eastern New Mexico, some eastern portions of the Oklahoma Panhandle, far south-central Kansas, and portions of northwest Texas.  This ecoregion has a "cold semiarid" climate (Köppen BSk).  Some years, a National Weather Service dust storm warning is issued in parts of Texas due to a dust storm originating from the lower part of the Southwestern Tablelands ecological region or from the southern end of the Western High Plains ecological region.

Included cities

 The Canadian River, north of Amarillo, Texas, is the central corridor of the Southwestern Tablelands.
 Snyder, Texas
 La Junta, Colorado
 Colorado Springs, Colorado
 The western edge is near Pueblo, Colorado,  and Albuquerque, New Mexico
 The northern edge is south of Dodge City, Kansas
 The eastern edge is west of Woodward, Oklahoma

Environment
Flora
In the northwestern region, the prevalent vegetation consists of grasses of the shortgrass prairie ecosystem and sagebrush.

Fauna

See also
List of ecoregions in the United States (EPA)
List of ecoregions in the United States (WWF)

References

External links
Native Prairies Association of Texas (NPAT)
NPAT protected prairies
The Nature Conservancy (TNC)
Connemara Conservancy
Soil Physics at Oklahoma State
Weeds of the Blackland Prairie
Texas counties map showing the ecoregion  

Grasslands of the North American Great Plains
Ecoregions of the United States
 
Geography of Texas
Grasslands of Texas